Rentun Ruusu is a 2001 Finnish biographical film drama directed and written by Timo Koivusalo. The film is based on the life of Antti Yrjö Hammarberg (Irwin Goodman) who is still today a very popular singer in Finland. The film stars Martti Suosalo and Ilkka Koivula with Vexi Salmi as narrator. The film premiered in Helsinki on 12 January 2001. The name Rentun ruusu is from Irwin Goodman's song, and the album Rentun ruusu was his biggest and sold 125,000 copies.

By 5 April 2001 it took $2,236,169 at the box office, and it was the most watched Finnish movie of 2001. The film won an award and nomination at the Jussi Awards.

Cast

Main cast
Martti Suosalo ... Irwin Goodman
Ilkka Koivula ... Vexi Salmi
Vexi Salmi ... Narrator
Esko Nikkari ... Väiski
Eeva-Maija Haukinen ... Irwin's mom, Kirsti Hammarberg
Hannu Kivioja ... Kaspar
Riitta Salminen ... Riitta Feirikki-Hammarberg
Matti Mäntylä ... Toivo Kärki
Tom Lindholm ... Eikka
Kunto Ojansivu ... Alpo
Raimo Grönberg ... Honkanen

Mikko Kivinen ... Tappi Suojanen
Seppo Sallinen ... Keihänen
Erkki Ruokokoski ... Ilmari Kianto
Timo Julkunen ... Mape
Maarit Niiniluoto ... Radiohaastattelija
Harri Ekonen ... Lentäjä 1
Aimo Santaoja ... Lentäjä 2
Matti Nurminen ... Taksikuski torilla
Kai Tanner ... Taksikuski lentokentällä
Raimo Viitanen ... Nimismies
Seppo Helenius ... Virkamies
Risto Luukko ... Tuomari
Sonja Saarinen ... Kaija
Tapani Mäki ... Vartija 2
Johanna Jokela ... Nuori ihailijatyttö

Minor cast

Jevgeni Haukka ... Venäläinen tullimies 1
Martti-Mikael Järvinen ... Otto
Timo Nissi ... Eki
Martti Palo ... Erik Lindström
Alexander Pritoup ... Venäläinen tullimies 2
Taneli Rinne ... Verotarkastaja
Raino Rissanen ... Vartija 1
Kielo Tommila ... Aila
Andrei Tsumak ... Venäläinen tullimies 3
Harry Viita ... Ralliperuna

External links

http://www.yle.fi/tv2draama/rentunruusu/index.html 
http://www.artistafilmi.fi/RentunRuusu_sivut/vexinmuistelu.html

2000s Finnish-language films
2001 films
Finnish biographical films
Films directed by Timo Koivusalo
2000s biographical films